Nakiri bōchō (菜切り包丁, translation: knife for cutting greens) and usuba bōchō (薄刃包丁, thin knife) are Japanese-style vegetable knives. They differ from the deba bōchō in their shape, as they have a straight blade edge suitable for cutting all the way to the cutting board without the need for a horizontal pull or push. These knives are also much thinner. While the deba bōchō is a heavy blade for easy cutting through thin bones, the blade is not suitable for chopping vegetables, as the thicker blade can break the vegetable slice. The nakiri bōchō and the usuba bōchō have a much thinner blade. This does not help with cutting small bones in fish or meat, but is useful for cutting vegetables.

Nakiri bōchō are knives for home use, and sometimes have a black finished, or Kurouchi, blade. The cutting edge is angled from both sides, called ryōba in Japanese. This makes it easier to cut straight slices.

Usuba bōchō are vegetable knives used by professionals. They differ from the Nakiri bōchō in the shape of the cutting edge. While the nakiri bōchō is sharpened from both sides, the usuba bōchō is sharpened only from one side, a style known as kataba in Japanese. The highest quality kataba blades have a slight depression on the flat side. This kataba style edge gives better cuts and allows for the cutting of thinner slices than the ryōba used for nakiri bōchō, but requires more skill to use. The sharpened side is usually the right side for a right hand use of the knife, but knives sharpened on the left side are available for left hand use. The usuba bōchō is heavier than a nakiri bōchō, although still much lighter than a deba bōchō.

See also
 Japanese kitchen knives
 List of Japanese cooking utensils

References

Japanese kitchen knives

ja:菜切り包丁